Events in the year 2022 in Kiribati.

Incumbents 

 President: Taneti Maamau
 Vice President: Teuea Toatu

Events 

Ongoing — COVID-19 pandemic in Kiribati

 20 January – The country announces a curfew and mandatory face masks after 36 passengers on a charter flight from Fiji test positive for COVID-19 upon arrival. The plane was the first international commercial flight to land in the country since March 2020. Kiribati reopened its borders on January 10.

Current event - 2022 Kiribati constitutional crisis.

Deaths

See also 

 History of Kiribati

References 

 
2020s in Kiribati
Years of the 21st century in Kiribati
Kiribati
Kiribati